Simon Sez is a 1999 action film starring Dennis Rodman, Dane Cook, and John Pinette. The film was directed by Kevin Alyn Elders, and the score was composed by Brian Tyler.

The film received extremely negative reviews and became a box office bomb.

Premise
Interpol agent Simon goes on a mission in France to save a kidnapped girl and defeat an arms dealer.

Cast
Dennis Rodman as Simon.
Dane Cook as Nick Miranda.
John Pinette as Micro, a fellow cyber-monk
Ricky Harris as Macro, a fellow cyber-monk
Filip Nikolic as Michael Gabrielli
Natalia Cigliuti as Claire Fence
Emma Wiklund as The Dancer
Jérôme Pradon as Ashton
Xiong Xin Xin as Xin Xin

Production
On June 18, 1998, Variety reported that Rodman had entered into an agreement with Sony to star in an action film, yet to be titled. Variety characterized the deal as a "byproduct of the [1998] lockout by NBA owners," as the work stoppage had temporarily put on hold Rodman's commitments to the league. Originally, Ringo Lam was set to direct along with Elders, with Lam, Moshe Diamont, and Dwight Manley producing. Ultimately, however, only Elders was credited as director, and only Lam and Diamont as producers.

Release
The film was released in 1999, opening in Los Angeles on September 24 and then in New York on September 25. The film grossed a total of $292,152 on a $10 million budget, making the film a box office bomb.

Reception
Simon Sez has a 0% rating on review aggregator Rotten Tomatoes, based on 20 reviews, with an average rating of 1.85 out of 10. The website's consensus reads, "Simon Sez no matter how starved you are for something to watch, there has to be a better option than this dreadfully misguided action thriller." Writing for The New York Times, Lawrence Van Gelder gave a scathing review of the movie, stating that "its plot seems as if it had been fished out of the wastebaskets of writers who have written scores of better examples of the genre dating at least as far back as Dr. No in 1962", though he did find Rodman "inescapably watchable". Entertainment Weekly gave the film a D− rating, calling it "a shoddy mess" and "a bargain-basement rip-off of Ronin," and adding that Rodman was "yesterday's threatening omni-sexual exhibitionist turned today’s overexposed cliché."

References

External links
 

1999 films
1999 action thriller films
American action thriller films
Films scored by Brian Tyler
1990s English-language films
1990s American films